The Opera House in Quay Street, Manchester, England, is a 1,920-seater commercial touring theatre that plays host to touring musicals, ballet, concerts and a Christmas pantomime. It is a Grade II listed building. The Opera House is one of the main theatres in Manchester. The Opera House and its sister theatre the Palace Theatre, Manchester on Oxford Street are operated by the same parent company, Ambassador Theatre Group.

History

The theatre opened as the New Theatre in 1912, renamed the New Queen's Theatre in 1915 and as the Opera House in 1920 when it came under the wing of John Hart and his associates of United Theatres Ltd. In 1931, it was bought by, and prospered under, Howard & Wyndham Ltd which had been formed at the Theatre Royal, Glasgow in 1895 by Michael Simons. The group's managing director A Stewart Cruikshank, headquartered at the group's headquarters in the King's Theatre, Edinburgh, was joined on the board by Charles B Cochrane who now became a visiting producer at the Opera House, premiering numerous musicals and revues. The theatre staged the full range of plays, musicals, opera, and pantomime.

It closed in 1979 and for five years was a bingo hall. The Palace Trust acquired it in 1984 and returned it to a theatre. In 1990, it was acquired by Apollo Leisure and staged large-scale musicals. It was subsequently sold to Ambassador Theatre Group in 2009. In March 2020 the theatre acquired Charitable Incorporated Organisation status along with the Palace Theatre.

Architecture

The theatre has a rectangular plan and is built of stuccoed brick with a slate roof. Its symmetrical fifteen-bay facade is in the classical style with a five-bay centre with fluted Ionic columns. Above the three central bays is a relief of a horse-drawn chariot within a semi-circular arch. The gable has a moulded cornice on brackets. The entrance canopy is a 20th-century addition.

The auditorium has two curved cantilevered balconies with large overhangs, each holding 500 seats. Either side of the stage are stacked boxes between pairs of fluted Corinthian columns. The high proscenium arch is decorated with a circular medallion flanked by gryphons. The high ceiling above the auditorium takes the form of a coffered segmental tunnel vault.

The orchestra pit holds 80 musicians. The theatre has 1,920 seats.
The theatre was redecorated in March 2011 keeping the green and gold colour scheme of the auditorium unchanged.

Notable productions and premieres

 1958 - European premiere of West Side Story
 1993 to 1995 - British regional premiere of Andrew Lloyd Webber's musical The Phantom of the Opera
 2005 - Demon Days Live concert by Gorillaz
 2011 - World premiere of Ghost The Musical
 2012 - UK premiere of Dolly Parton's musical 9 to 5
 2017 - World premiere of Bat Out of Hell: The Musical
 2017 - World premiere of Take That's musical The Band
 2019 - World premiere of & Juliet
 2020 - World premiere of Back to the Future: The Musical
 2022 - UK premiere of Mrs. Doubtfire

See also

 Listed buildings in Manchester-M3
 Live Nation deal – Ambassador Theatre Group's acquisition of venues previously owned by Live Nation UK
 Palace Theatre

References

External links

 Official website
 Opera House Manchester on ATG Tickets
 The Opera House, Quay Street, Manchester on Arthur Lloyd.co.uk
 Independent guide

Theatres in Manchester
Theatres completed in 1912
Grade II listed buildings in Manchester
1912 establishments in England